Son of Man is a British television play by playwright Dennis Potter which was first broadcast on BBC1 on 16 April 1969, in The Wednesday Play slot. An alternative depiction of the last days of Jesus, Son of Man was directed by Gareth Davies and starred Northern Irish actor Colin Blakely. The play was shot on videotape over three days on a very limited budget: Potter was later to say that the set "looks as though it's trembling and about to fall down."

Controversy
The treatment of the subject matter led to Potter's being accused of blasphemy by Christian morality campaigner Mary Whitehouse. Blakely's burly, disheveled Jesus was depicted as being tormented by seizures and self-doubt, repeatedly crying out, "Is it me?", as he struggles with his own nature as God incarnate whilst being vulnerable to human frailty. Potter's work focuses on Jesus's message of universal love, but eschews any mention of miracles or the resurrection. Potter's Jesus believes that people should try to love their enemies rather than fight all the time, but is racked by self-doubt as to whether or not he is the popularly-anticipated Messiah. In one of the play's most oft-cited moments, Jesus examines an upright cross recently used for crucifixion, admires the quality of its timber, and sighs, "You should have stayed a tree, and I should have stayed a carpenter." The character of Judas Iscariot is identified with the rich young man of the synoptic gospels and Pontius Pilate is depicted as a callous and wily political manipulator who recognizes the danger of Jesus' teachings upsetting the Roman status quo; Pilate therefore means to have Jesus executed whilst appearing outwardly reluctant to give the order, leaving the Jewish Sanhedrin the blame. The Jewish high priest Caiaphas is depicted as caught between appeasement of the Roman occupiers and the satisfaction of a Messiah-hungry Jerusalem; both Pilate and Caiaphas show moments of doubt when they condemn Jesus. The play fades to black upon the death of Jesus on the cross.

Cast and crew

Cast

 Colin Blakely as Jesus
 Robert Hardy as Pontius Pilate
 Bernard Hepton as Caiaphas
 Brian Blessed as Peter
 Edward Hardwicke as Judas Iscariot 
 Godfrey Quigley as the Roman Commander
 Patricia Lawrence as Procla
 Gawn Grainger as Andrew
 Clive Graham as Roman Centurion
 Godfrey James as 1st Soldier
 Eric Mason as 2nd Soldier
 Brian Spink as Zealot
 Hugh Futcher as 1st Heckler
 Raymond Witch as 2nd Heckler
 Robin Chadwick as Young Officer
 Colin Rix as James
 Walter Hall as Philip
 Wendy Allnutt as Ruth
 Keith Campbell as 1st Priest
 Edmund Bennett as 2nd Priest
 Allan Lawrance as Money Changed
 Paul Prescott as Man in Crowd
 George Desmond as Leper
 Polly Murch as Woman Possessed
 Peter Beton as Beaten Samaritan 
 Edmund Bailey as 3rd Heckler
 David Cannon as Beggar
 Roy Stewart and Dinny Powell as Boxers

Crew

 Written by Dennis Potter
 Music: Carmel College Choir (Choirmaster: Martin Fogell)
 Lighting: Robert Wright
 Sound: Bryan Forgham
 Costumes: Dinah Collin
 Makeup: Sandra Hurll
 Story Editor: Shaun MacLoughlin
 Designer: Spencer Chapman
 Producer: Graeme MacDonald
 Director: Gareth Davies

Stage version
Potter's play was also adapted for the stage and played at the Roundhouse, London, with Frank Finlay in the leading role.   The stage version of Son of Man was first produced on 22 October 1969, at the Phoenix Theatre, Leicester.

Phoenix Theatre cast
 Frank Finlay as Jesus
 Joseph O'Conor as Pontius Pilate
 Ian Mullins as Caiaphas
 David Daker as Peter
 David Henry as the Roman Commander
 Linda Polan as Procla
 Stanley Lebor as Andrew
 Wendy Allnutt as Ruth

Legacy
Son of Man co-stars Colin Blakely and Robert Hardy would both portray the eccentric Siegfried Farnon from the James Herriot books; Blakely in the 1975 film It Shouldn't Happen to a Vet and Hardy in the 1978-1990 television series All Creatures Great and Small.

Colin Blakely would appear in another televised dramatization of the life and death of Jesus Christ; he played Caiaphas in the 1980 American television film The Day Christ Died (in which the role of Jesus was played by Chris Sarandon).

Interviewed by The Guardian in 2020, Irish actor Ciarán Hinds listed the 1969 broadcast of Son of Man as one of his "teenage obsessions":

Son of Man has been repeated on television but, to date, has never received an official release on any physical home entertainment format.

References

External links

1969 television plays
Television shows written by Dennis Potter
Portrayals of Jesus on television
Films about Jesus
Television shows based on the Bible
Cultural depictions of Judas Iscariot
Cultural depictions of Pontius Pilate
Cultural depictions of Saint Peter